"Crazy in Love" is a song recorded by American singer Beyoncé, featuring a rap verse and ad-libs from her future husband Jay-Z from her debut solo studio album Dangerously in Love (2003). The song was released as the album's lead single on May 14, 2003, through Columbia Records and Music World Entertainment. Both artists wrote and composed the song in collaboration with Rich Harrison and Eugene Record; the former also produced it with Beyoncé. Using samples from the Chi-Lites's 1970 song "Are You My Woman (Tell Me So)", "Crazy in Love" is a pop, hip hop and R&B love song that incorporates elements of soul, and 1970s-style funk music. Its lyrics describe a romantic obsession that causes the protagonist to act out of character.

"Crazy in Love" was a number-one hit in the United States and United Kingdom, and reached the top ten in various other countries worldwide. The song was universally acclaimed; music critics praised the hook, Jay-Z's contribution, and Beyoncé's assertive delivery of the lyrics. VH1 declared it the greatest song of the 2000s decade, while Rolling Stone ranked it at number 16 on their list of the 500 greatest songs of all time in 2021, and in 2018, declared the song the greatest of the 21st century so far. At the 46th Annual Grammy Awards (2004), "Crazy in Love" won Grammy Awards for Best R&B Song and Best Rap/Sung Collaboration.

The song's accompanying music video features Beyoncé in various dance sequences. It won three awards at the 2003 MTV Video Music Awards, and its director, Jake Nava, won the Music Video Production Association award for Best R&B Video in 2004. Since 2003, "Crazy in Love" has been a staple in Beyoncé's live performances and concert tours. The American Society of Composers, Authors and Publishers (ASCAP) recognized "Crazy in Love" as one of the most performed songs of 2004. Artists including David Byrne have covered the song, and it has been used in various television shows and other media.

Development and production

By July 2002, Beyoncé had already recorded several songs which would appear on Dangerously in Love. Columbia Records planned to release the album in October 2002; however, the release was postponed several times to capitalize on the success of American rapper Nelly's 2002 single "Dilemma," which features Beyoncé's former Destiny's Child colleague Kelly Rowland. These delays allowed Beyoncé to record more songs for the album.

Before meeting Beyoncé, Rich Harrison had conceptualized the beat of the song. He had sampled the hook's instrumentation from the 1970 song "Are You My Woman? (Tell Me So)," which had originally been written and composed by Eugene Record, frontman of the Chicago-based vocal group the Chi-Lites. When Harrison first played the beat to his friends, they could not "dig it," and this made him realize that he had conceived something special, which people would appreciate better after hearing the whole record. Thus Harrison decided not to market the selection, and instead, he waited for the right artist to record it: "I had it in the chamber, I had not really shopped it much, because sometimes you do not want to come out of the bag before it's right. People do not really get it and you will leave them with a foul taste in their mouth."

Harrison was pleasantly surprised when he got a call from Beyoncé, who was working on one of the most anticipated albums of the year. However, things did not turn up according to his plans the following day, as he was late and was still suffering the effects of a hangover. When Harrison played the sample to Beyoncé in the studio, the singer initially had doubts about the "sound so full of blaring fanfare;" it seemed too retro and according to her, no one used horn riffs in the 21st century. Nevertheless, Beyoncé accepted the sample, much to Harrison's delight, and gave him two hours to write and compose the song while she went out.

Harrison confessed that it was not easy for him to come up with the lyrics to "Crazy in Love" in that length of time. But two hours later, he had written the verses and the hook, in spite of being hung over. Harrison had also made provision for a backing track; he played all the instruments on the track. The bridge was written by Beyoncé, who was inspired by looking at herself in the mirror; as she was not wearing matching clothes and her hair was untidy, she kept saying, "I'm looking so crazy right now." Harrison sang back to her and said, "That's the hook." It also inspired the title of the song. After that Beyoncé had filled up the middle eight, she came up with the catchphrase – "Uh-oh, uh-oh, you know" – alongside Harrison.

Featured artist Jay-Z became involved late in the song's production. Around 3 am, he came to the studio and recorded a rap verse, which he improvised in about ten minutes. The recording of "Crazy in Love" took place nearly three months following the meeting of Beyoncé with Harrison.

Music and lyrics

According to the sheet music published at Musicnotes.com by Alfred Music Publishing, "Crazy in Love" was composed in the key of D-minor and F-major. It incorporates influences of 1970s-style funk, hip hop, and soul. As commented by Robert Webb of The Independent, the old soul influences in the song seem to have been derived from the horn hook, which samples the 1970 song "Are You My Woman? (Tell Me So)." Having a go-go vibe, "Crazy in Love" is built on a hip hop beat. Beyoncé told The Sunday Herald that the beat is "so hard that it makes your heart hurt." The song's tempo is a moderate 100 beats per minute, in common time. Beyoncé's vocal range spans around one and a half octaves in the song, from the low note of A3 to the high note of F5. "Crazy in Love" uses two major chords, B♭ and G, a minor third apart. One of the main vocal riffs uses the traditional cowbell rhythm often found in samba music. Lisa Verrico of The Times magazine, wrote that "Crazy in Love" makes use of big drums and bits of brass.

According to Natalie Nichols of the Los Angeles Times, the lyrics of "Crazy in Love" reference a state of romantic obsession. Beyoncé said that the song talks "about how, when you are falling in love, you do things that are out of character and you do not really care because you are just open." Anthony DeCurtis of Rolling Stone wrote that "Crazy in Love" has "such a cauldron of energy," that Beyoncé sounds "loose and sexy," gripped by emotions she "can neither understand nor control." The lyrics are composed in the traditional verse-chorus form. Jay Z opens the song with a brief spoken verse-rap, containing the lyrics: "Yes! So crazy right now. Most incredibly, it's your girl, B. It's your boy, Young. You ready?" After Beyoncé delivers the "uh-oh, uh-oh" catchphrase, Jay Z continues the monologue. Beyoncé begins the first verse, followed with the whistle-backed chorus. She repeats the "uh-oh, uh-oh" phrase, leading to the second verse. The chorus follows, giving way to the second verse-rap which contains the lyrics: "Jay Z in the range, crazy and deranged [...] I been iller than chain smokers, how you think I got the name 'Hova', I been real and the game's over". The song continues to the bridge, singing: "I'm not myself, lately I'm foolish, I don't do this, / I've been playing myself, baby, I don't care / 'Cuz your love's got the best of me, / And baby, you're making a fool of me, / You got me sprung and I don't care who sees." She then sings the chorus again and the song fades out with the horns.

Release
"Crazy in Love" was first released for digital download via iTunes Store in the United States on May 14, 2003. It was then sent to rhythmic contemporary, contemporary hit radio, and urban contemporary radio stations in the United States on the week of May 18, 2003. In the United Kingdom, it was released for digital download via iTunes Store on May 20, 2003. Notably, the song was also fairly successful as a ringtone among cell phone users across the United States. The song was released as a CD single in Ireland and Switzerland, and as a digital EP in Germany on June 20, 2003. "Crazy in Love" was released as a maxi single in Germany on June 30, 2003, and in Australia on July 7, 2003. The song was issued as a CD single in the United Kingdom on June 30, 2003. "Crazy in Love" was released as a digital EP in several European countries, including Austria, Belgium, Denmark, Finland, Italy, the Netherlands, Norway, and Sweden on July 8, 2003. This digital EP was also available in Canada and Ireland on July 8, 2003. On July 22, 2003, two remixes–one from Rockwilder and the other from Adam 12–were released in the United States.

Critical reception
"Crazy in Love" was acclaimed by contemporary music critics, who complimented the horn lines and the guest appearance of Jay-Z. Many of them called it the Summer Anthem of 2003. Tim Sendra of AllMusic described the song as a "stunning pop masterpiece", while Stephen Thomas Erlewine of the same website called it "deliriously catchy". Darryl Sterdan of Jam! noted the "Crazy in Love" is "instantly addictive horn lines". Anthony DeCurtis of Rolling Stone wrote: "'Crazy in Love' ... roars out of the speakers on the strength of a propulsive horn sample and the charged presence of her pal, Jay-Z." Ben Ratliff of Blender magazine called the song an "itchy [and] eager-to-please" one. Marc Anthony Neal of PopMatters called the "uh-oh, uh-oh" phrase catchy. MTV News considered "Crazy in Love" to be the "proudest moment" of Dangerously in Love. Similarly, Allison Stewart of The Washington Post called it the best song on the album, praising its instrumentation, harmonies, and the rap verse of Jay Z. This was echoed by Kelefa Sanneh of The New York Times who wrote that "Crazy in Love" is the best one on the album thanks to its "simplicity, irresistible combination of triumphant horns and a wicked hip-hop beat". She added that "[Beyoncé's] vocals – as deft and accurate as ever – convey none of the giddy rush that the lyrics describe." Likewise, Sal Cinquemani of Slant Magazine wrote the lyrical arrangement, the music structure and the guest vocals by Jay Z all contributed in making "Crazy in Love" a wonderful resume for Beyoncé.

Rob Fitzpatrick of NME called "Crazy in Love" a "head-nodding [and] body-rocking funk-soul genius" and wrote that it is "a 100 per cent, stone-cold, dead-cert classic". He complimented Beyoncé's vocals, describing them as "genuinely, hip-grindingly fruity". Los Angeles Times writer Natalie Nichols noted that "sexy dance tunes as the vintage funk-flavored 'Crazy in Love'" made Dangerously in Love a great album. Neil Drumming of Entertainment Weekly wrote that the song has a "fresh sound". Spence D. of IGN Music wrote that Beyoncé rides the "infectious rhythm" with grace and mid-range seductively. He added, "As [it] can be expected, the track bumps when Jay drops his distinctive uptown flavor. While other rap-meet-R&B tracks often fall flat, this one works well as Beyoncé and Jay's verbals play nicely against one another." Lisa Verrico of The Times wrote that Jay Z performed a "decent rap", however, "Beyoncé and the beats save the day" and that "Crazy in Love" was a departure for Beyoncé from Destiny's Child.

Commercial performance
"Crazy in Love" was a commercial success in the United States, debuting at number fifty-eight on the Billboard Hot 100. Although it hadn't yet been released to retail stores, the single gained much attention and reached number one on the Billboard Hot 100 based on heavy rotation alone. The same week it reached number one, Dangerously in Love debuted on the Billboard 200 at number one on July 12, 2003. Substantial airplay, and later in retail, gains of "Crazy in Love" allowed it to dominate the chart, spending eight consecutive weeks at number one on the Hot 100, making it Beyoncé's first number one single in her solo career. According to Nielsen SoundScan, "Crazy in Love" was the most downloaded song in the United States for four consecutive weeks in July 2003. "Crazy in Love" spent fifteen weeks in the top ten, twenty-six weeks in the top fifty, and twenty-seven weeks on the chart in total. The song was certified gold by the Recording Industry Association of America (RIAA) in 2004 while its mastertone was also certified gold two years later. "Crazy in Love" was the fourth biggest hit of 2003 in the United States. By October 6, 2010, "Crazy in Love" had sold 47,000 physical units in the United States. "Crazy In Love" also has the distinction of being the first number-one single on Billboard's inaugural Hot Dance Airplay Chart, which debuted on August 16, 2003, where it spent seven weeks at the top spot.

In the United Kingdom, Beyoncé became the third female artist to top the UK Singles Chart and UK Albums Chart simultaneously, following Mariah Carey in 1994 and Kylie Minogue in 2001. Including her career with Destiny's Child, "Crazy in Love" became Beyoncé's third number one single in the United Kingdom and was the only song to top the charts the United Kingdom and the United States simultaneously in 2003. The single spent three weeks at number one in the United Kingdom and fifteen weeks in the top hundred. As of March 2018, it has sold over 1 million units in the country, making it her second best selling song there. "Crazy in Love" reached number one on the Irish Singles Chart, where it spent eighteen weeks. In Australia, "Crazy in Love" peaked at number two on the ARIA Singles Chart and was certified nine-times platinum by the Australian Recording Industry Association (ARIA) with sales of over 630,000 units. It also peaked at number two on the New Zealand Singles Chart, and was certified platinum by the Recording Industry Association of New Zealand (RIANZ). "Crazy in Love" reached top ten throughout Europe, including Austria, the Belgian territories of Flanders and Wallonia, Denmark, Germany, Hungary, Italy, the Netherlands, Norway, Sweden and Switzerland.

Music video

Production and synopsis
The music video of "Crazy in Love", released in May 2003, was directed by Jake Nava and filmed in downtown Los Angeles. In MTV Making of the Video 2003 documentary, Beyoncé described the video's conception: "[It] celebrates the evolution of a woman. It is about a girl who is at the point of a relationship. She realizes that she is in love, she is doing stuff she would not normally do but she does not care. It does not matter she is just crazy in love."

The opening sequence of the video features Jay-Z as a passenger in a car speeding along Mission Road in Los Angeles, where he encounters Beyoncé, standing in the middle of the road, at the Fourth Street bridge. Beyoncé performs in various dance sequences, beginning with her wearing a white tank top, denim blue shorts, and red high-heels. She performs an elaborate solo dance on a riser. The scene shifts to a gold set with a mock photo shoot, before moving into a scene with dancers detailing Beyoncé and dancing against a wall while wearing caps and full length pants. Jay Z appears and ignites a line of petrol leading to a car parked under the bridge, which explodes in flames. Jay Z performs his rap in front of the burning car, and Beyoncé dances beside him, wearing an exotic silk print over a fur coat, before kicking the valve off a fire hydrant. She continues to dance while the water is flying everywhere. The video ends with Beyoncé and her dancers wearing vibrant Versace dresses in front of a large fan. Their outfits contrast with the neutral colors of the background, the video. Carmit Bachar, then a member of The Pussycat Dolls, is one of the dancers.

Reception and accolades
The music video received acclaim by music critics. Cynthia Fuchs, writing for PopMatters commented that the photo shoot scene uses the routine used by Jennifer Lopez in the video for "Jenny from the Block" (2002) with hot lights, scary makeup, and inclusion of many shots of legs. She wrote that: "Beyoncé's body becomes its undeniable emblem." Tom Moon of The Philadelphia Inquirer wrote that Beyoncé "shakes every inch of her famously photogenic goddess frame."

The music video won three awards at the 2003 MTV Video Music Awards in the categories of Best Female Video, Best R&B Video, and Best Choreography. It however lost to Good Charlottes "Lifestyles of the Rich & Famous" in the Viewer's Choice category. Director Nava also won a Music Video Production Association award for the Best R&B Video in 2004. During the same year, the video won the Best Collaboration award at the 2004 MTV Video Music Awards Japan, where it was also nominated for the Best Female Video award. "Crazy in Love" was nominated at the 36th NAACP Image Awards for the Outstanding Music Video award. It won the Best International Video award at the 2004 MuchMusic Video Awards. The song is also recognized as the Best Selling Mobile Ringtone in the United Kingdom for 2003 In 2014, The Guardian writer Michael Cragg included the clip for "Crazy in Love" in his list of the ten best music videos by Beyoncé. He offered high praise for it, saying "Aware of how much of a statement the song was, the video is a checklist of icon-making visuals, from the locations... the dance moves... to the part where she makes bubble blowing look like the sexiest thing a human could do."

Live performances

Beyoncé first performed "Crazy in Love" with Jay Z at the 2003 BET Awards. They also performed the song during the 2003 MTV Video Music Awards. She sang the song in a medley, with the pre-recorded vocals of Sean Paul on "Baby Boy" (2003). "Crazy in Love" was included on the set list for most of Beyoncé's concert tours. The song was the closing track of her Dangerously in Love World Tour that began in late 2003.
On February 8, 2004, Prince appeared at the 46th Annual Grammy Awards with Beyoncé. In a performance that opened the show, they performed a medley of "Purple Rain", "Let's Go Crazy", "Baby I'm a Star", and Beyoncé's "Crazy in Love". Beyoncé performed "Crazy in Love" live at the 2004 BRIT Awards February 17, 2004. Monique Jessen And Todd Peterson wrote that she, "...lit up the stage with her performance of "Crazy in Love", wearing a white Roberto Cavalli dress and nearly half a million dollars worth of diamonds. The pop diva, appearing onstage in a puff of smoke, stopped midway through the song to pull up her top before walking away with the best international female solo artist award." Beyoncé and Jay Z also performed "Crazy in Love" at The Prince's Trust Urban Music Festival at Earls Court in London on May 31, 2004.

"Crazy in Love" was the first song on Beyoncé's set list on The Beyoncé Experience in Los Angeles and the I Am... World Tour at several venues, including the Odyssey Arena in Belfast, the O2 Arena in London, and in Athens and Sydney. On August 5, 2007, Beyoncé performed the song at Madison Square Garden in New York City. Beyoncé emerged in a sparkling silver dress with a long train. She walked to the front of the stage, did a couple of snaps of her neck and then started singing "Crazy in Love". She climbed a staircase where her all-female band and three backup singers were positioned. The staircase moved forward in two places; top part moved while the bottom poked out more. At the top of her staircase, she removed her train and returned to the main stage. Her backup singers followed and danced with Beyoncé. After "Crazy in Love", Beyoncé performed a short rendition of Gnarls Barkleys "Crazy" (2006), singing: "Who do you, who do you think you are? / Ha, ha, ha, bless your soul."

Shaheem Reid of MTV News wrote: "There are few (very few) ladies out there who can really sing, a lot who can dance, a lot more who look good — but really no other who can combine all three and add iconic star power like Miss Beyoncé, arguably the best all-around stage performer in the game right now." Jon Pareles of The New York Times wrote: "Beyoncé needs no distractions from her singing, which can be airy or brassy, tearful or vicious, rapid-fire with staccato syllables or sustained in curlicued melismas. But she was in constant motion, strutting in costumes (most of them silvery), from miniskirts to formal dresses, flesh-toned bodysuit to bikini to negligee." Frank Scheck of The Hollywood Reporter wrote: "Her performance of 'Crazy in Love' featured some surprising arrangements that gave the material freshness". Performances of "Crazy in Love" were included on her live albums The Beyoncé Experience Live (2007), and the deluxe edition of I Am... World Tour (2010). Beyoncé performed "Crazy in Love" wearing a pink fringe dress at a concert at Palais Nikaïa in Nice, France, on June 20, 2011, in support of her album 4, and at the 2011 Glastonbury Festival on June 26, 2011.

In August 2011, Beyoncé performed "Crazy in Love" during her revue show 4 Intimate Nights with Beyoncé. She performed a slowed-down, jazzier version of the song and danced with a similar routine to the one in the music video. During the ITV special A Night With Beyoncé which aired on December 4 in the United Kingdom, Beyoncé performed "Crazy in Love" to a selected crowd of fans. In May 2012, she performed the song during her Revel Presents: Beyoncé Live revue in Atlantic City, New Jersey, United States' entertainment resort, hotel, casino and spa, Revel. During the performance, Jay-Z did not appear on stage but his pre-recorded voice was heard. Dan DeLuca of noted that the song was one of the "beat-savvy booty-shaking workouts" performed during the revue. Jim Farber of New York Daily News wrote that "The first, and last parts of the show stressed the steeliest Beyoncé, told in bold songs" like "Crazy in Love". A writer of Black Entertainment Television noted that, "She dazzled fans with an assortment of high-energy performances of her upbeat hits like... 'Crazy in Love.'" Beyoncé also performed the song at the Super Bowl XLVII halftime show held on February 3, 2013. In July 2013, while placing Beyoncé at number 33 on their list of 50 Best Live Musicians, the writers of Rolling Stone magazine noted that the performance of "Crazy in Love" was a highlight during her live shows with the singer "expertly poppin' her booty".

Cover versions
Several artists have recorded cover versions of "Crazy in Love". In 2003, Irish singer-songwriter Mickey Joe Harte recorded an acoustic rendition of "Crazy In Love" for the charity album Even Better Than the Real Thing Vol. 1. Alternative rock band Snow Patrol recorded the song during a BBC session with Zane Lowe. Snow Patrol's version was released as a B-side to the single "Spitting Games", on the compilation Cosmosonica – Tom Middleton Presents Crazy Covers Vol. 1 and on Snow Patrol's compilation album Up to Now. Ross Langager of PopMatters noted that their cover "sparks an initial chuckle of recognition but soon after becomes more than a bit unfortunate". David Byrne closed his concert at the Hollywood Bowl on June 27, 2005, with a samba-tinged version of "Crazy in Love". In 2007, American alternative rock band Switchfoot produced a rock version that was released as part of Yahoo!'s CoverArt series. Switchfoot produced a video for their cover version. Nashville-based indie quintet Wild Cub performed a version of the song in June 2014 for The A.V. Club A.V. Undercover series.

British band The Magic Numbers performed "Crazy in Love" on the Australian radio station Triple J, and recorded it for the Starbucks (Hear Music) compilation album, Sounds Eclectic: The Covers Project (2007). Tracy Bonham covered the song with guitar and violin accompaniment, for her 2007 album In The City + In The Woods. British close harmony trio The Puppini Sisters covered "Crazy in Love" for their 2007 album The Rise and Fall of Ruby Woo; this was remixed by the electronica jazz outfit The Real Tuesday Weld. Indie artist Dsico recorded an electronic cover of the song. In 2009, Pattern Is Movement recorded a cover of "Crazy in Love", which they claimed was inspired by Anohni's version; this cover was included on their September 4, 2009 Daytrotter session. Antony and the Johnsons released an orchestral version of the song as the b-side to their 2009 single "Aeon". Indie singer-songwriter Eden recorded a cover version of "Crazy in Love" for his final extended play (EP) under the EDEN Project alias.

German group The Baseballs covered the song in rockabilly style for their debut album Strike! Back in August 2010. "Crazy in Love" was performed live on Australian Idol during the first season by winner Guy Sebastian on the Final 2 showdown in 2003. A jazz version was performed during the fourth season by runner-up Jessica Mauboy on the Final 6 Big Band show in 2006.  In June 2008, Mauboy performed "Crazy in Love" on Indonesian Idol with some eliminated contestants. Singapore Idol contestant Maia Lee performed "Crazy in Love" on the show. In March 2012, Swing Republic released their electro swing cover version which also ended up featuring on their album released the same year entitled Midnight Calling. In June 2012, Robin Thicke and Olivia Chisholm covered the song during the show Duets. Kate Kroll of Rolling Stone gave a negative review for Chisholm's performance, saying that "Her voice sounded thin, and she just can't seem to shake that Stepford Wife stare." Emeli Sandé and The Bryan Ferry Orchestra recorded a cover of the song which was included on The Great Gatsby soundtrack (2013). Upon hearing a preview of the song, Randall Roberts of the Los Angeles Times commented that the cover was the best song on the album sang with a "surprising, simmering urgency". Kyle Anderson of Entertainment Weekly also wrote that the swing cover of "Crazy in Love" was one of the highlights on the album. On October 21, 2013, Third Degree covered "Crazy in Love" on the fifth season of The X Factor Australia, and on May 4, 2014, C Major covered the song on the third series of The Voice Australia. In 2015, Monica Michael covered the song on The X Factor UK. Filipina actress Denise Laurel covered the song while impersonating Beyoncé, based on her performance at the Super Bowl XLVII halftime show on Your Face Sounds Familiar, in which Laurel won the season.

Usage in media
In 2002, Beyoncé signed a contract with Pepsi, and appeared on several of its advertising campaigns, one of which featured "Crazy in Love" as background music. After winning the Best Collaboration Awards for "Crazy in Love" at the 2004 BET Awards, Beyoncé dedicated the award to the show's host, comedian Mo'Nique, who parodied the choreography from the "Crazy in Love" video with six equally voluptuous female dancers. "Crazy in Love" was included on the official soundtrack albums of the following films: Bridget Jones: The Edge of Reason (2004), White Chicks (2004), Taxi (2004), Good Luck Chuck (2007), Gayby (2012), and Love, Rosie (2014), as well in the tenth season of Brazilian soap opera Malhação. In 2009, the cast of Glee performed a mash up of the songs "Hair" from the musical Hair and "Crazy in Love" in season one, episode eleven "Hairography". A parody of the song is also used in the Disney Channel's show That's So Raven, in the episode "Hizzouse Party". It was featured on the video games Karaoke Revolution Party and Just Dance 2. On the eleventh series of Dancing on Ice, Gemma Collins and Matt Evers performed to the song on the first week of the competition.

Accolades and legacy

Entertainment Weekly magazine ranked "Crazy in Love" forty-seven in its list of The 100 Greatest Summer Songs. The song was also ranked as the Best Song of 2003 from NME, Mojo, Nöjesguiden, Rockdelux, Dotmusic, Playlouder and Magic The song was listed at number three on Rolling Stones list of the 50 Best Songs of the 2000s Decade in 2009, and as the one-hundred-and-eighteenth greatest song of all time on the magazine's list of the 500 Greatest Songs of All Time (2010), as well as ranking it at number two on the list Singles of the Year, and at number three on their 100 Best Songs of the 2000s list, writing: "The horns weren't a hook. They were a herald: Pop's new queen had arrived."

In 2018, the song topped Rolling Stone list on "100 Greatest Songs of the Century – So Far". In 2021, Rolling Stone placed "Crazy in Love" at number 16 on its list of the 500 Greatest Songs of All Time. The song also placed at number one on the Singles of the Decade by The Times Literary Supplement and 75 Best Singles of the Decade by The Observer. "NME" staff voted "Crazy in Love" the best song of the 2000s, calling it "a dancefloor-destroying howitzer of a pop song.", also ranking it at number nineteen on their list of five hundred best songs of all time. The song was ranked at number four on Pitchfork Media's list of The Top 500 Tracks of the 2000s, number seven on The Daily Telegraphs list of the best songs of the decade and number six on Slants list of the 100 Best Singles of the Decade. In September 2011, VH1 ranked "Crazy in Love" number one on its list of The 100 Greatest Songs of the 2000s. In October 2011, to mark NMEs fifteenth birthday, its staff members selected the one-hundred-and-fifty tracks "that have meant the most to [them] over the site's lifetime", placing "Crazy in Love" at number sixteen. In 2012, the song was ranked at number twenty-two on Billboards list of "Top 50 'Love' Songs of All Time". In 2013, John Boone and Jennifer Cady of E! placed the song at number one on their list of ten best Beyoncé's songs, writing: "It's the song that started it all. The definitive best Beyoncé jam is her first, complete with a guest spot by now-husband Jay Z, a killer hook and a chorus of horns that you have to dance to. Literally have to, Pavlovian conditioning-style." In a 2013 list of Jay Z's 20 Biggest Billboard Hits, "Crazy in Love" was ranked at number one. On July 5, 2013, NME magazine named "Crazy in Love" "the Best Pop Song of the Century". Q ranked the song at number fifty-nine on their list of 1001 Best Songs Ever. It was also ranked at number two on The Village Voices list Pazz + Jop 2003.

In 2004, "Crazy in Love" was nominated for three Grammy Awards in the categories of Best R&B Song and Best Rap/Sung Collaboration, which it won, and Record of the Year, which it did not win. A remix of "Crazy in Love", known as "Krazy in Luv" (Maurice's Nu Soul Mix), won the award Best Remixed Recording, Non-Classical for its remixer, Maurice Joshua. "Crazy in Love" was also recognized at the 2004 ASCAP Pop Music Awards Awards as one of the Most Performed Songs and its publisher, EMI, received the Publisher of the Year award. Vibe magazine's VIBE Awards recognized the song for Coolest Collaboration in 2003. In Europe, "Crazy in Love" won the Best Song award at the 2003 MTV Europe Music Awards. "Crazy in Love" won the awards for Best R&B/Urban Track and Best Pop Dance Track at the 22nd Annual International Dance Music Awards in 2003. It was recognized by Beyoncé's peers in the urban markets, and won the award for Best Collaboration at the BET Awards, where it also received a nomination in the Viewers Choice Awards category in 2004. "Crazy in Love" was nominated at the 36th NAACP Image Awards for the Outstanding Song award and for Favorite Song at the 2004 Kids' Choice Awards.

Remixes

"Crazy in Love" has various remixes, including the Rockwilder remix, Maurice Joshua's Nu Soul remix, and Juniors World remix. These versions appeared on the single releases of "Crazy in Love" under an alternative spelling, "Krazy in Luv". The Rockwilder remix slows down the beat and makes the song deeper and funkier with chopped up horn samples and sparkling synth textures from sampling Don't Stop the Music by Yarbrough and Peoples. Maurice's Nu Soul Remix speeds up the beat, taking it from hip-hop to house territory. A version of the song included on Asian special edition of Dangerously in Love features a rap in Mandarin Chinese performed by American-Taiwanese singer Vanness Wu, instead of Jay Z's performance.

"Crazy in Love" was re-recorded by Beyoncé for the film Fifty Shades of Grey (2015) and used for its trailer, which was released on July 24, 2014. The slowed-down version was produced by Boots with violin arrangements by Margot, both of whom worked on Beyoncé's self-titled fifth studio album (2013), and, unlike the original, doesn't feature Jay-Z. Margot said: "It inspires me to work on other artists' songs [because] it pushes my boundaries in a direction that I wouldn't necessarily come up with. Obviously I know how 'Crazy in Love' goes, but I knew there was the possibility her vocals would be different. It's almost more vulnerable and beautiful this way, because you do do crazy things when you fall in love. To hear the mood reversed and flipped makes it even more powerful."

The track was then officially released through iTunes Store on February 10, 2015. The single cover artwork uses the same image used in the original cover, but in black and white. The rendition was performed for the first time during the 2015 Budweiser Made in America Festival on September 5, 2015 and was included on the setlist of The Formation World Tour (2016), alongside the original version.

Track listings and formats

Credits and personnelRecording and management Recorded at Sony Music Studios (New York City)
 Mixed at The Hit Factory (New York City)
 Additional vocals recorded at The Hit Factory (New York City)
 Contains samples of the composition "Are You My Woman (Tell Me So)", written by Eugene Record, published by Unichappell Music Inc. (BMI) and performed by The Chi-Lites (courtesy of Brunswick Records)
 Jay-Z appears courtesy of Roc-A-Fella Records and Def Jam Recordings
 Published by Beyoncé Publishing (ASCAP), Hitco South South (ASCAP) — all rights administered by Music of Windswept (ASCAP) — EMI Blackwood Music Inc. OBO Itself (BMI), Dam Rich Music (BMI), EMI April Music Inc. OBO Itself (BMI), Carter Boyd Publishing (ASCAP) and Unichappell Music Inc. (BMI)Personnel'

 Beyoncé – lead vocals, background vocals, production
 Rich Harrison – production, instrumentation
 Pat Thrall – recording
 Tony Maserati – mixing
 Jim Caruana – engineer

 Pat Woodward – assistant mix engineer
 Luz Vasquez – assistant mix engineer
 Jay-Z – songwriting
 Maurice Joshua – remixing

Charts

Weekly charts

Year-end charts

Decade-end charts

All-time charts

Certifications

Release history

See also
 List of best-selling singles
 List of European number-one hits of 2003
 List of number-one singles of 2003 (Ireland)
 List of Hot R&B/Hip-Hop Singles & Tracks number ones of 2003
 List of Billboard Hot 100 number-one singles of 2003
 List of number-one dance singles of 2003 (U.S.)
 List of Hot R&B/Hip-Hop Singles & Tracks number ones of 2003
 List of artists who have achieved simultaneous UK and US number-one hits
 List of best-selling singles in Australia

References

External links

Beyoncé songs
2003 singles
2003 songs
Billboard Hot 100 number-one singles
Columbia Records singles
European Hot 100 Singles number-one singles
Funk songs
Grammy Award for Best Rap/Sung Collaboration
Grammy Award for Best Remixed Recording, Non-Classical
Irish Singles Chart number-one singles
Jay-Z songs
MTV Video Music Award for Best Female Video
Music videos directed by Jake Nava
Number-one singles in Scotland
Song recordings produced by Beyoncé
Song recordings produced by Rich Harrison
Songs written by Beyoncé
Songs written by Eugene Record
Songs written by Jay-Z
Songs written by Rich Harrison
UK Singles Chart number-one singles